Sun Guoting (646–691) or Sun Qianli (孫虔禮), was a Chinese calligrapher of the early Tang Dynasty, remembered for his cursive calligraphy and his Shu Pu (書譜, "A Narrative on Calligraphy" or "Treatise on Calligraphy" (ca. 687)). The work was the first important theoretical work on Chinese calligraphy, and has remained important ever since, though only its preface survived. The preface is the only surviving calligraphic work of Sun, therefore it is responsible for both Sun's reputation as an artist and as a theorist. The original handscroll can be seen at the National Palace Museum, in Taipei, Taiwan, and on its web site.

Notes

References
Two Chinese Treatises on Calligraphy: Treatise on Calligraphy (Shu pu) by Sun Qianli; Sequel to the "Treatise on Calligraphy" (Xu shu pu) by Jiang Kui; Yale University Press, 1995; .
 Zhu, Guantian, "Sun Guoting". Encyclopedia of China, 1st ed.

External links

 National Palace Museum web site entry on the Treatise on Calligraphy, with full high-resolution scan of the complete work
 Answers.com Art Encyclopedia entry on Sun Guoting
 Modelling and English Translation of Sun Guoting's "A Narrative on Calligraphy"  - Annotated translation and introduction of Shu Pu (A Narrative on Calligraphy).
 English translation of a brief excerpt of the Treatise on Calligraphy

646 births
691 deaths
7th-century Chinese calligraphers
Tang dynasty calligraphers